Pamoctan Island is an island in the Philippines. It is situated to the north of Pinon Island and Siship Lake. The estimate terrain elevation above sea level is 168 metres. It is one of the islands on Babuyan Islands.

References 

Babuyan Islands